Lifta was a Palestinian Arab village on the outskirts of Jerusalem. The village was depopulated during the early part of the 1947–1948 civil war in Mandatory Palestine.

In July 2017 Israel declared Lifta (called Mei Neftoach) as a national nature reserve. It has been referred to as the "Palestinian Pompeii".

History

Biblical identification
The site is considered by some to be identical with biblical  Mei Neftoach. It was populated since ancient times; "Nephtoah" (Hebrew: נפתח, lit. spring of the corridor) is mentioned in the Hebrew Bible as the border between the Israelite tribes of Judah and Benjamin, and was the northernmost demarcation point of the territory of the Tribe of Judah. Other scholars hold the identification to be plausible but by no means certain. Kitchener and Conder found the identification with Nephtoah unsatisfactory, and preferred to identify Lifta with Eleph of Benjamin (Joshua 18:28).

Iron Age
Archaeological remains dating as far back as Iron Age II have been found in the village.

Roman and Byzantine periods
The Romans and Byzantines called it Nephtho, and the Crusaders referred to it as Clepsta.

Crusader period
The remains of a court-yard home from the Crusader period remains in the centre of the village.

Ottoman era
In 1596, Lifta was a village in the Ottoman Empire, nahiya (subdistrict) of Jerusalem under the liwa' (district) of Jerusalem, and it had a population 72 Muslim households, an estimated  396 persons. It paid taxes on wheat, barley, olives, fruit orchards and vineyards; a total of 4,800  akçe. All of the revenue went to a waqf.

In 1834, a battle took place here, during the revolt of that year. The Egyptian Ibrahim Pasha and his army fought and defeated local rebels, led by Shaykh Qasim al-Ahmad, a prominent local ruler. However, the Qasim al-Ahmad family remained powerful and ruled the region southwest of Nablus from their fortified villages of Deir Istiya and Bayt Wazan some  due north of Lifta. In 1838 Edward Robinson noted  Lifta  as a Muslim village, located in the Beni Malik area, west of Jerusalem. Robinson hired muleteers from Lifta, noting that in Lifta "every peasant keeps his mule and usually accompanies it".

In 1863 Victor Guérin described Lifta as being surrounded by gardens of lemon-trees, oranges, figs, pomegranates, alms and apricots. An Ottoman village list of about 1870 indicated 117 houses and a population of 395, though the population count included men, only.

The PEF's Survey of Western Palestine in 1883 described it as a village on the side of a steep hill, with a spring and rock-cut tombs to the south.

In 1896 the population of Lifta was estimated to be about 966 persons.

In 1907 the German historian Gustav Rothstein was invited to  Lifta by his Arabic language teacher, Elias Nasrallah Haddad. Rothstein wrote a 20-pages article describing the marriage celebrations and religious festivals in Lifta.

British Mandate era

In 1917, Lifta surrendered to the British forces with white flags and, as a symbolic gesture, the keys to the village.

In the 1922 census of Palestine, Lifta had a population 1,451, all Muslims, increasing in the 1931 census (when Lifta was counted with "Shneller's Quarter"), to 1,893; 1,844 Muslims, 35 Jews and 14 Christians, in a total of 410 houses.

During the 1929 Palestine riots, according to one Israeli source, some villagers from Lifta were among gangs that  participated in a number of robberies and attacks on nearby Jewish communities.

In the 1945 statistics the population of Lifta was 2,250; 2,230 Muslims and 20 Christians, and the total land area was 8,743 dunams, according to an official land and population survey. 3,248 dunams were for cereals, while 324 dunams were built-up (urban) land.

Prior to 1948, the village, with a population of some 2,500 people, had orchards, several olive presses, a winepress, in addition to a modern clinic, two coffeehouses, two carpentry shops, barbershops, a butcher, and a mosque. A small number of Jews resided in the village, and one former Jewish inhabitants described the relationship her family and the Palestinian majority as 'excellent'.

In the 1947–48 Civil War in Mandatory Palestine Lifta, Romema, and Shaykh Badr which were strategically located on the road leaving Jerusalem to Tel-Aviv, were an operational priority for Jewish forces.  Some families had already left the village after a decision had been made  somewhat earlier on 4 December, to evacuate its women and children, in order to host a military company, and on 4 December 1947 some Arab families left. By mid-December irregular Arab militia took up positions in Lifta to defend the site. Hagannah patrols engaged in firefights with the village militiamen while Irgun and Lehi were even more aggressive. On 28 December 1947, the village suffered from what survivors called the “Lifta massacre” when a Jewish militia launched a machine-gun and grenade assault on the café of Salah Eisa.  In order to warn residents that they should evacuate, the mukhtar's home was incinerated, and 20 buildings blown up as the village was put under siege. The attack left seven dead, and more women and children left the village. The village was suffering from food shortages in the beginning of January. Subsequently, a number of the villagers returned home, with Benny Morris reporting "some, or most" doing so. Subsequently, Abd al-Qadir al-Husayni, while visiting the village, ordered the women, children and elderly to evacuate and the men to stay put. On 29 January, a Lehi raid blew up 3 houses in the village. By early February the village was abandoned by the irregular militia. Benny Morris lists the cause of the depopulation of the village as being a military assault on the settlement.

According to one resident, interviewed in 2021, there were are around 40,000 descendents of the original refugee population, dispersed in East Jerusalem, the West Bank, Jordan and the Palestinian diaspora. Several families still retain their Ottoman period property deeds, attesting to their ownership of parts of Lifta.

State of Israel
After the expulsion of its Palestinian villagers, of Lifta's 410 homes, 60 stone houses, some three stories high, remained, together with its  mosque, an olive press, and a tiled pathway to a spring. It is listed by Unesco as a potential World Heritage Site, and in 2018, the World Heritage Fund registered the village among a list of 24 heritage sites that were endangered.

Lifta was used for Jewish refugee housing during the war, and following the war the Jewish Agency and the state of Israel settled Jewish immigrants from Yemen and Kurdistan in the village, totaling 300 families. However ownership of the houses was not registered in their name. Living conditions in Lifta were difficult, the buildings were in poor repair, poor roads and transport, and lack of electricity, water, and sanitation infrastructure. In 1969-71 most of the Jewish inhabitants of Lifta chose to leave as part of a compensation program by Amidar. Holes were drilled in the roofs of the evacuated buildings to make them less inhabitable, so that squatters wouldn't take up residence. 13 families, who lived in the portion of the village close to Highway 1 and didn't suffer from transportation issues chose to remain.

In the 1980s, Lifta was declared a municipal nature reserve under the auspices of the Israel Nature and Parks Authority.

In 1984, one of the abandoned buildings in the village was occupied by the "Lifta gang", a Jewish group plotting the blow up the mosques on the Temple Mount, who were stopped at the gates of the site with 250 pounds of explosives, hand grenades, and other armaments.

Following the departure of the Jewish residents, some of the buildings in the village were used for Lifta drug abuse rehabilitation center for adolescents, which was closed in 2014, and from 1971 for the Lifta high school, an open education school, which relocated to German Colony, Jerusalem in 2001.

In 2011, plans were announced to demolish the village and build a luxury development consisting of 212 luxury housing units and a hotel. Former residents brought a legal petition to preserve the village as a historic site. Lifta was the last remaining Arab village that was depopulated to have not been either completely destroyed or re-inhabited.  In 2012, the  plans to rebuild the village as an upscale neighborhood were rejected by the Jerusalem District Court.

By 2011, three books about the Palestinian village history had been published.

In June 2017 the last Jewish residents left the village following a settlement with the government who acknowledged they were not squatters but rather resettled in Lifta by the appropriate authorities.
In July 2017 Mei Neftoach was declared a national nature reserve. 55 out of 450 pre-1948 stone houses are still standing.

In 2021, the Israel Land Administration, without informing beforehand the Jerusalem Municipality authorities,  announced on Jerusalem Day that it was reported to be preparing a tender for the  construction of a luxury neighborhood on the village's ruins, projected to consist of  259 villas, a hotel, and a mall.

Archaeology
In 2010, an archaeological survey was conducted at Lifta by Mordechai Heiman on behalf of the Israel Antiquities Authority (IAA).

Arab traditional dress

Lifta was among the wealthiest communities in the Jerusalem area, and the women were known for their fine embroidery Thob Ghabani bridal dresses were sewn in Lifta. They were made of ghabani, a natural cotton covered with gold color silk floral embroidery produced in Aleppo, and were narrower than other dresses. The sleeves were also more tapered. The sides, sleeves and chest panel of the dress were adorned with silk insets. The dresses were ordered by brides in Bethlehem. The married women of Lifta wore a distinctive conical shaṭweh head-dress, that was also worn in Bethlehem, Ayn Karim, Beit Jala and Beit Sahour.

Notable people
 Rasmea Odeh
 Yahya Hammuda

See also
 Ali Abunimah
 List of modern names for biblical place names
 Palestinian costumes
 Zochrot

References

Bibliography

 
  (p. 544)
 
 (no. 293, pp. 436−437)
 (plate LVIII)
 
 
  (p. 900)
 Gilbert, Major Vivian (1936): The Romance of the last Crusade, London, UK 
 
 
 
 
 
 
 
 
 
 
 
 

 
 
  (A catalog of the MOIFA (Museum of International Folk Art at Santa Fe's) collection of Palestinian clothing and jewellery.)
  (pp. 758-60; cited in Pringle, 1997, p. 66)

External links

 Welcome to Lifta, palestineremembered.com; accessed 2 September 2015.
 Lifta, Zochrot
 , The Ruins of Lifta (2016) 
 Israel Antiquities Authority, Jerusalem, Lifta, Survey (2010)
 Survey of Western Palestine, Map 17: IAA, Wikimedia commons
 Lifta in Antiquity Archaeological Survey of Israel
 F.A.S.T.-Lifta Preservation Joint project on the reconstruction of memory and the preservation of Lifta, archive.org, 14 May 2006.
 Lifta photos by Dr Moslih Kanaaneh, jalili48.com; accessed 2 September 2015.
 Lifta, by Rami Nashashibi (1996), Center for Research and Documentation of Palestinian Society.
 Lifta, zochrot.org
 Return to Lifta, 13 May 2006, zochrot.org
 Lifta Society website, liftasociety.org
 Lifta website, schulen.eduhi.at
 3D models of different houses in Lifta, sketchfab.com; accessed 2 September 2015.

Arab villages depopulated prior to the 1948 Arab–Israeli War
Hebrew Bible places
Neighbourhoods of Jerusalem
Ghost towns in Asia